The Sabana Formation (Q1sa, QTs) is a geological formation of the Bogotá savanna, Altiplano Cundiboyacense, Eastern Ranges of the Colombian Andes. The formation consists mainly of shales with at the edges of the Bogotá savanna lignites and sandstones. It is the uppermost formation of the lacustrine and fluvio-glacial sediments of paleolake Humboldt, that existed at the edge of the Eastern Hills until the latest Pleistocene.

The uppermost sediments of the Sabana Formation were deposited during the Last Glacial Maximum, a time when the first humans populated the Bogotá savanna. These hunter-gatherers used the bones of the still extant Pleistocene megafauna as Haplomastodon waringi, Cuvieronius hyodon and Equus amerhippus lasallei, of which fossils have been found in the Sabana Formation.

Knowledge about the formation has been provided by geologists Alberto Guerrero, Thomas van der Hammen and others.

Etymology 
The formation was first defined and named after the Bogotá savanna (Sabana de Bogotá) by Hubach in 1957, further described by Van der Hammen in 1973, Guerrero (1992, 1993, 1996) and by Helmens and Van der Hammen in 1995.

Regional setting 

The Bogotá savanna is a slightly undulated montane savanna in the southwestern part of the Altiplano Cundiboyacense, a high plateau in the Eastern Ranges of the Colombian Andes. The Altiplano was formed during the latest stage of Andean uplift in the Plio-Pleistocene, exposing rocks of mainly Cretaceous to Paleogene ages at surface. A small massif of Paleozoic age is present in the northern part of the Altiplano; the Floresta Massif around Floresta comprising the fossiliferous formations Floresta and Cuche.

During the Mesozoic, the central part of Colombia was a rift basin to the west of the Guyana Shield, where series of marine platform deposits were deposited. The proto-Caribbean, the result of the break-up of Pangea, formed a long seaway into the South American Plate, up to Bolivia. During the Late Cretaceous, the Western and Central Ranges of the Colombian Andes began rising, while the Eastern Ranges was still absent. The main phase of tectonic uplift of the Eastern Ranges commenced in the Middle Miocene, marked by a change in paleocurrents of the fluvial deposits of the Honda Group, the most fossiliferous stratigraphic unit of Colombia.

Subduction of the Nazca Plate underneath western South America and the resulting compression in the continent created reversal of former extensional faults of the Mesozoic rift basin in the Eastern Ranges. A series of fold and thrust belts, oriented in a north–south to northeast–southwest sense, were formed in the Eastern Andes, uplifting the former marine strata and creating a high plateau between the western and eastern fronts; the Altiplano Cundiboyacense. The tectonic movements of this Andean orogenic phase are reflected in Upper Miocene units as the Marichuela Formation, underlying the Pliocene and Pleistocene sediments of which the Sabana Formation represents the final chapter.

Description

Lithologies 
The Sabana Formation consists mainly of horizontally bedded little consolidated grey and greenish shales with lignite and diatomites, and fine to coarse sandstones at the edges of the Bogotá savanna. Numerous volcanic ash deposits are noted in the Sabana Formation. Organic material is preserved in black soils and silts form the terraces of the central part of the savanna. The volcanic ash had as provenance area the Central Ranges of the Colombian Andes, with probably minor influences from the volcanic areas of Boyacá (Paipa–Iza volcanic complex). The diatomites are associated with the ash layers, a common feature in the geological record.

Stratigraphy 
The Sabana Formation in some areas conformably overlies the Subachoque Formation, in other parts unconformably the Tilatá Formation, and is overlain by the alluvium of the Holocene, with the southeasternmost area of the savanna covered and intercalated by the fluvio-glacial deposits of the Tunjuelo Formation. The formation is subdivided into six units of alternating shales and fine sandstones. The age has been estimated to be Middle to Late Pleistocene, based on fission track analysis and radiocarbon dating. The Sabana Formation is time equivalent with the Soatá (upper Sabana), and Sogamoso Formations of the northern Altiplano, and the upper part of the Guayabo Formation of the Llanos Basin.

Depositional environment 

The depositional environment has been interpreted as lacustrine (Lake Humboldt) and fluvio-deltaic, with a near-continuous deposition since the Late Pliocene. The Sabana Formation represents the uppermost unit of the lacustrine deposition of Lake Humboldt. At the edges of the lake, numerous deltas of fluvio-glacial origin were present, reflected in the coarser sediments. During periods of stormy climate around the lake, coarser sediments were transported to the interior of the lake. The depositional cycles were geologically speaking fast and the water level of the lake fluctuated greatly during its history. Furthermore, the local tectonic activity of the Bogotá savanna, related to movements of the Bogotá Fault, influenced the depositional cycles. The middle unit of the formation shows a drying out of the lake and subaerial erosional surfaces. The upper part of the Sabana sequence is characterised by fluvial deposits around a retreating Lake Humboldt, estimated at an age of around 30,000 years BP. The glacial origin was predominantly the Sumapaz Páramo to the south of the Bogotá savanna, with minor snow-capped peaks in the Eastern Hills of Bogotá.

Present-day, the lakes of Fúquene, Herrera and Suesca are remnants of Lake Humboldt, as well as the many wetlands of Bogotá.

Paleoecology 
The Sabana Formation was deposited during the Pleistocene glaciations and interglacials ("ice ages"). During the Last Glacial Maximum of the Pleistocene, the paleoecology of the region varied drastically, marking movements of the upper tree line and the types of vegetation. Pollen analysis shows that páramo vegetation was abundant from 30 ka to 17,500 years ago, with an increase in Andean forest frequency dated at 15.6 ka. Between 13,000 and 11,000 years BP, a decrease in Andean forest percentage is observed, indicative of a colder climate than before. This period has been named the Fúquene stadial. The stadial is followed by an interstadial (Guantivá), with an increase in lake levels of Lake Fúquene. The wetter periods of the interstadial covered earlier paleotopography with humic sediments.

During the last phase of deposition of the Sabana Formation, the Bogotá savanna was surrounded by populations of Pleistocene megafauna. Fossils of the ground sloths Megatherium and Eremotherium have been uncovered from Quipile, and Fusagasugá and Tocaima respectively, Haplomastodon waringii from Tocaima and Pubenza, accompanied by shells of Neocylotus cf. cingulatus, to the west of the savanna, and Cuvieronius hyodon and Equus amerhippus lasallei from the Sabana Formation at Tibitó. The migration of fauna was favoured by the existence of a dry corridor from the Magdalena River to the Eastern Ranges. Analysis of the fluorine in a fossil molar of a gomphothere, found in the Sabana Formation at Mosquera, provided an age between the last interglacial and the first stage of the last glacial of the Last Glacial Maximum. The fossils of Pubenza and Tibitó were dated at 16,300 ± 150 and 11,740 ± 110 years BP respectively. Researchers at the Universidade Federal do Estado do Rio de Janeiro, UNIRIO propose that all gomphotheres found in Colombia should be reassigned to a single species; Notiomastodon platensis. At the latest age of Tibitó, a páramo ecosystem was dominant.

Human settlement 

The latest sedimentation phase of the Sabana Formation, evidenced by the sites El Abra, Tibitó and Tequendama, was accompanied by the first confirmed human settlement in Colombia. Around 12,500 years BP, groups of hunter-gatherers populated the rock shelters surrounding the retreating Lake Humboldt. The people of the area hunted the still extant Pleistocene species, and used their remains for the construction of primitive settlements, as bone tools and the skins as clothing. At this stage, the timber line was  lower than today.

During the Holocene, the inhabitants of the Bogotá savanna gradually moved away from the rock shelters as permanent settlements in favour of more open area locations, as Checua and Aguazuque. Around 5000 years BP, agriculture became a more dominant phenomenon and the fertile clays mixed with volcanic ash of the Sabana Formation, combined with the bimodal pattern of seasonal precipitation made the Bogotá savanna an ideal area for growing crops. Pottery was used in the Herrera Period, from around 2800 years BP onwards, and the sediments of the Sabana Formation were used for various styles of ceramics, grouped by researchers based on the colour of the original clays. The northern settlement of Suesca was an important ceramic producing centre for the people. An advanced civilisation developed in the first and second millennia CE, leading to the Muisca Confederation, a loose collection of caciques. The southern Muisca area was centered around the Bogotá savanna with as main settlement Bacatá in the middle of the savanna, the namesake of the current capital of Colombia, Bogotá.

With the expansion in the late colonial and early republican era of the Colombian capital to the west and north of the city, the unconsolidated finer sediments of the Sabana Formation became more and more the foundation for construction, leading to problems due to the differential compaction of the sandy and more clay-rich strata.

Outcrops 

The Sabana Formation is found at its type locality in the Funza II well, and covering most of the Bogotá savanna. The newer parts of Bogotá, especially the neighbourhoods north of the Avenida Chile (Calle 72) in Chapinero and west of the Autopista Norte (Avenida 30), rest upon the Sabana Formation, where the unconsolidated shales cause frequent fissures in the roads constructed in the Colombian capital. The southeastern part of Bogotá, including the historic centre, rests upon the more competent Tunjuelo Formation.

Regional correlations

See also 

 Geology of the Eastern Hills
 Geology of the Ocetá Páramo
 Geology of the Altiplano Cundiboyacense

Notes

References

Bibliography

Geology

Paleoecology and history

Proposed reclassification of gomphotheres

Maps 
 
 
 

Geologic formations of Colombia
Pleistocene Colombia
Shale formations
Lacustrine deposits
Fossiliferous stratigraphic units of South America
Paleontology in Colombia
Formations
Geography of Cundinamarca Department
Geography of Bogotá